William Devine could mean:

 William John Devine, a Canadian ice hockey administrator and radio personality better known as Jack Devine (ice hockey)
 William Patrick Devine, an American professional baseball player better known as Mickey Devine